Gertrude Wutzl is an Austrian former international table tennis player.

She won a silver medal at the 1951 World Table Tennis Championships in the Corbillon Cup with Gertrude Pritzi and Ermelinde Wertl for Austria.

See also
 List of table tennis players
 List of World Table Tennis Championships medalists

References

Austrian female table tennis players
World Table Tennis Championships medalists